Viktor Thorn may refer to:
 Viktor Thorn (Nordic combined skier) (fl. 1895), Norwegian Nordic combined skier
 Viktor Thorn (cross-country skier) (born 1996), Swedish cross-country skier

See also
 Victor Thorn (1844–1930), Luxembourg politician